Franklin is an unincorporated community in the town of Herman, in Sheboygan County, Wisconsin, United States. Franklin is located at the intersection of County Highway M and the Sheboygan River, about 1 mile (1 km) from Lakeland College. The Franklin Feed Mill is listed on the National Register of Historic Places. The town hall for Herman is located inside the community.

Notable people
William F. Sieker, farmer and politician, lived on a farm near Franklin within the town of Herman.

Images

References

Unincorporated communities in Wisconsin
Unincorporated communities in Sheboygan County, Wisconsin